Jorge Valentín (born 16 August 1964) is a retired Cuban sprinter who specialised in the 400 metres. He won a gold medal in the 4 × 400 metres relay at the 1991 Pan American Games.

His personal best in the event is 45.19 seconds set in Santiago de Cuba in 1987.

International competitions

References

1964 births
Living people
Cuban male sprinters
Athletes (track and field) at the 1991 Pan American Games
Pan American Games medalists in athletics (track and field)
Pan American Games gold medalists for Cuba
Central American and Caribbean Games gold medalists for Cuba
Competitors at the 1986 Central American and Caribbean Games
Central American and Caribbean Games medalists in athletics
Medalists at the 1991 Pan American Games
20th-century Cuban people